M-205 was a state trunkline highway in the US state of Michigan. The route was turned back to local control in October 2002 by the Michigan Department of Transportation (MDOT) after the completion of M-217 (Michiana Parkway). MDOT swapped roadways with the Cass County Road Commission ending the 67-year history of M-205.

Route description
M-205 ran through an agricultural landscape from a connection with State Road 19 (SR 19) at the state line north of Elkhart, Indiana, northward for about  along Cassopolis Road before turning easterly through a sweeping curve. The roadway is bordered by houses in the area as it continues to an intersection with US Highway 12 (US 12, the former US 112) between Union and Adamsville. The highway went through no towns within Michigan, but did connect with some short local roads.

History
When the state highway system was initially signposted in 1919, a highway numbered M-23 ran north from the state line near Union and turned east, eventually connecting all the way to Ypsilanti in Washtenaw County, east of Detroit.
On the original approved US Highway plan, M-23 was replaced by US 112, running over the border into Indiana. Michigan diverted that highway along a route entirely within Michigan, and the very short, but locally important segment of cut-off highway became M-205. The curve between Cassopolis and Redfield roads was realigned to give M-205 a more sweeping curve in 1950.
As part of the swap between MDOT and Cass County, M-217 was designated several miles to the east as a new connector to the toll road, and M-205 was transferred to local control on October 10, 2002, decommissioning the trunkline.

The highway is now identified as "Old M-205" on road signs. Its old northern end, an intersection on US 12 was rebuilt as a traffic circle after the highway was decommissioned.

Major intersections

See also

References

External links

Former M-205 at Michigan Highways

205
Transportation in Cass County, Michigan